Rob Zettler (born March 8, 1968) is a Canadian former professional ice hockey defenceman who played in the National Hockey League (NHL) for 14 seasons with the Minnesota North Stars, San Jose Sharks, Philadelphia Flyers, Toronto Maple Leafs, Nashville Predators and Washington Capitals.

Playing career
Zettler was drafted 55th overall by the Minnesota North Stars in the 1986 NHL Entry Draft.

After two seasons with the North Stars organization, he was claimed by the San Jose Sharks in the 1991 NHL Dispersal Draft. On February 1, 1994, the Sharks traded Zettler to the Philadelphia Flyers in exchange for Viacheslav Butsayev.

Philadelphia traded him to the Toronto Maple Leafs for a fifth-round pick in the 1996 NHL Entry Draft on July 8, 1995. With Toronto Zettler enjoyed his most productive season in 1996-97, scoring 2 goals and adding 12 assists for 14 points. After being left unprotected by the Maple Leafs he was claimed by the Nashville Predators in the 1998 NHL Expansion Draft.

On September 7, 1999, Zettler signed as a free agent with the Washington Capitals.

Rob Zettler announced his retirement on August 27, 2002, he finished his NHL career with 569 games, scoring 5 goals and 65 assists for 70 points.

Post-playing career
He had been an assistant coach under Ron Wilson, but was relieved of his duties after Wilson's firing.  He has also been an assistant coach for the San Jose Sharks (under former San Jose and former Toronto head coach Ron Wilson). Zettler also served as colour commentator for Washington Capitals radio broadcasts and provided commentaries on San Jose Sharks radio broadcasts before becoming an assistant coach. While a member of the Sharks coaching staff, he provided insight into games during telecasts with updates before the start of the second and third periods. On March 2, 2012, Zettler was again relieved of his position of assistant coach to Ron Wilson in favour of another position within the Toronto Maple Leafs organization.

In July 2012, Zettler was hired by the Tampa Bay Lightning to be an assistant coach with their AHL affiliate, the Syracuse Crunch. After the promotion of Jon Cooper on March 25, 2013, Zettler was named the head coach of the Crunch.

Although Zettler coached the Crunch to their first ever Calder Cup Finals appearance in 2013, Zettler had minimal success as head coach of the Crunch. In three full seasons as head coach of the Crunch, Zettler led the Crunch to one playoff appearance in that time frame, in which they were swept by the Wilkes-Barre/Scranton Penguins in round one of the 2015 Calder Cup playoffs. On May 10, 2016, the Syracuse Crunch announced the hiring of Benoit Groulx to replace Zettler as head coach of the team. 

On July 3, 2017, Zettler was hired as an assistant coach for the San Jose Sharks, replacing Bob Boughner, who was hired as head coach of the Florida Panthers on June 12, 2017. When Boughner returned to the Sharks on May 29, 2019, he filled Zettler's position on the staff.

On December 7, 2020, Zettler returned to the Lightning organization, becoming an assistant coach under Lightning head coach Jon Cooper once again.

Career statistics

Regular season and playoffs

Coaching record

References

External links
 

1968 births
Canadian ice hockey defencemen
Canadian people of German descent
Ice hockey people from Quebec
Kalamazoo Wings (1974–2000) players
Living people
Minnesota North Stars draft picks
Minnesota North Stars players
Nashville Predators players
People from Sept-Îles, Quebec
Philadelphia Flyers players
Portland Pirates players
San Jose Sharks coaches
San Jose Sharks players
Sault Ste. Marie Greyhounds players
Toronto Maple Leafs coaches
Toronto Maple Leafs players
Utah Grizzlies (IHL) players
Washington Capitals players
Canadian expatriate ice hockey players in the United States
Canadian ice hockey coaches
Tampa Bay Lightning coaches